Jesús Corona may refer to:

José de Jesús Corona (born 1981), Mexican goalkeeper
Jesús Manuel Corona (born 1993), Mexican winger